Nashrihab was a local governor at Hatra, an ancient town in modern-day Iraq. Nashrihab is known from many inscriptions of his son Naṣru and ruled from about AD 120 to 125. He was most likely the son of Elkud, who reigned before him.

Literature 
Michael Sommer: Hatra. Geschichte und Kultur einer Karawanenstadt im römisch-parthischen Mesopotamien. von Zabern, Mainz 2003, p. 27.

2nd-century Arabs
Hatra
2nd-century monarchs in the Middle East